Too Much Romance... It's Time for Stuffed Peppers is a 2004 Italian comedy-drama film written and directed by Lina Wertmüller.

Plot 

Maria and Jeffrey are a married couple in their seventies. Their marriage is in crisis. However, Maria tries to get the family together in order to celebrate grandmother Assunta's birthday.

Cast 

 Sophia Loren as Maria
 F. Murray Abraham as Jeffrey 
 Casper Zafer as Francesco  
 Carolina Rosi as Miriam 
 Silvia Abascal as Nelly
 Elio Pandolfi as Melino
 Angela Pagano as Assunta

See also 
 List of Italian films of 2004

References

External links

2004 films
2004 comedy-drama films
Italian comedy-drama films
Films directed by Lina Wertmüller
2000s Italian films